Doris Ling-Cohan is a justice of the New York State Supreme Court, to which she was elected in 2002. In 2014, Justice Ling-Cohan was appointed to the Appellate Term, First Department.  She is the first woman of Asian descent to be appointed to an appellate panel in New York state. Ling-Cohan was born in Chinatown, Manhattan, the daughter of Chinese immigrants.

Education
She received a degree in psychology (summa cum laude) from Brooklyn College, in 1976. She was admitted into New York University's School of Law on a full scholarship, from which she graduated in 1979.

Professional life
Judge Ling-Cohan began her career as an attorney working for several New York Legal Services agencies, representing indigent clients, before she joined the New York State Attorney General's consumer fraud protection unit. Additionally, she taught classes in law and Asian American studies at CUNY School of Law, New York University, City College, and Queens College. In 1995 Judge Ling-Cohan was elected to the Civil Court of the City of New York from the Second Municipal Court District.
At this time, Judge Ling-Cohan decided to seek elected positions rather than appointed ones, believing that judges who are continually tested by public opinion have a greater chance of later being elected to the State Supreme Court.
In 2002, after being nominated by the Manhattan Democratic party for election to the New York State Supreme Court, she received the support of the state Republican, Democratic, Liberal, and Working Family parties. Ling-Cohan was elected to that post, receiving more than 230,000 votes.
Judge Ling-Cohan is a member of several professional and humanitarian associations; she is a founding member of the Asian American Bar Association and the New York Asian Women's Center—which is the first group dedicated to the prevention of domestic violence in New York City's Asian communities. Additionally, she is a member of the Jade Council, an organization for Asian court employees.

Brooklyn College has honored Judge Ling-Cohan with its Distinguished Alumna Award, in recognition of her service to New York city as well as her advocacy for immigrants and non-English speakers' rights.

Same-sex marriage
Judge Ling-Cohan made national news when she handed down a ruling in Hernandez v. Robles, a case in which five gay and lesbian couples had sued New York, arguing that denying them marriage rights violated the state constitution. Ling-Cohan sided with the plaintiffs, and as of February 15, 2005, the ruling was on hold pending the outcome of an appeal filed by the state. See Judge Ling-Cohan's ruling in Hernandez v. Robles (PDF file) The decision was subsequently reversed by two appellate courts; however, same-sex marriage in the state of New York became legal on July 24, 2011, under the Marriage Equality Act, which was passed by the New York State Legislature on June 24, 2011 and signed by Governor Andrew Cuomo on the same day.

See also
 List of Asian American jurists
 List of first women lawyers and judges in New York
 Chinese Americans in New York City
 Same-sex marriage in New York

References
Ling-Cohan Appointed to Appellate Term.
Brooklyn College's Alumni Honor page on Ling-Cohan.
"Doris Ling-Cohan: First Asian Female Judge in NYS Supreme Court"

American women lawyers
New York University School of Law alumni
Year of birth missing (living people)
Living people
American jurists of Chinese descent
City University of New York faculty
New York University faculty
John Dewey High School alumni
Brooklyn College alumni
American women academics
21st-century American women